Rajang was a federal constituency in Sarawak, Malaysia, that was represented in the Dewan Rakyat from 1971 to 1990.

The federal constituency was created in the 1968 redistribution and was mandated to return a single member to the Dewan Rakyat under the first past the post voting system.

History
It was abolished in 1990 when it was redistributed.

Representation history

State constituency

Election results

References

Defunct Sarawak federal constituencies